The Oslo Diaries is a 2018 Israeli-Canadian documentary directed by Mor Loushy and Daniel Sivan about Middle Eastern peace talks at the Oslo accords in the 1990s between Israel and Palestine. The film premiered at the 2018 Sundance Film Festival, and had its broadcast debut on HBO September 13, 2018.

It featured Shimon Peres in one of his last interviews before his death.

Accolades
Nominated-Grand Jury Prize, Sundance 2018 

Nominated-Outstanding Historical Documentary, 40th News and Documentary Emmy Awards

References

External links
The Oslo Diaries on HBO

Portfolio

Israeli–Palestinian conflict films
Canadian documentary films
2018 films
Israeli documentary films
Documentary films about the Israeli–Palestinian conflict
Shimon Peres
2010s Canadian films